Tomato Bank, more commonly styled as TomatoBank, was an overseas Chinese bank in the United States.  Headquartered in Alhambra, California, with branch offices in Cerritos, California, Diamond Bar, California, Industry, California, and West Los Angeles, Los Angeles, California, this privately held community bank was first established on September 29, 2000. It was merged into Royal Business Bank in 2016 and branches were renamed to Royal Business Bank. 

The bank was established to serve the local Chinese community, but unlike those traditional overseas Chinese banks in the United States established earlier, a significant portion of the Tomato Bank clientele were wealthy Chinese immigrants either engaged in international trade and real estate business, or professionals.

One unique feature of the bank was that unlike other banks, the bank's founder was a physician instead of a businessperson: Dr. Stephen Liu. Dr. Liu's experience in banking included being a member of the board of American International Bank. 

The bank originally adopted several names, including InterBusiness Bank, Inter Business Bank, Tomato Bank, and Acer Bank. However, customer surveys revealed that the name Tomato Bank was most popular, partially because it was easy to remember. As explained by the former Chairman and CEO, Dr. Stephen Liu, at a business reception in mid-2006:

"It is an attractive brand name that brings to mind images of growth, multi-culture and health, all characteristics that represent who we are and what we strive to achieve. But most importantly, it is a brand that is recognizable and hard to forget. If there can be an Apple Computer - why not a Tomatobank? Try to forget it. You can't!"

The bank was acquired by Royal Business Bank in February 2016. It is not related to the Japanese Tomato Bank.

References

External links
Royal Business Bank homepage

Banks based in California
Banks established in 2000
Chinese American banks
Chinese-American culture in California
Companies based in Los Angeles County, California
Privately held companies based in California
Alhambra, California
2016 mergers and acquisitions
Banks disestablished in 2016